Frank Lawrence DiMichele (born February 16, 1965) is an American former professional baseball player who played one season for the California Angels of Major League Baseball (MLB).  He served as the head baseball coach at La Salle University from 1996 to 1997.

References

1965 births
Living people
American expatriate baseball players in Canada
Baseball coaches from Pennsylvania
Baseball players from Philadelphia
California Angels players
Edmonton Trappers players
La Salle Explorers baseball coaches
La Salle Explorers baseball players
Major League Baseball pitchers
Midland Angels players
Palm Springs Angels players
Quad Cities Angels players
Reading Phillies players
Salem Angels players
Wichita Wranglers players